Duşan Cantekin (born Dušan Gavrilović; ; born June 21, 1990) is a Serbian-born Turkish professional basketball player for Pınar Karşıyaka of the Basketbol Süper Ligi (BSL).

Professional career
In 2009, Cantekin signed with Anadolu Efes. As a member of Efes, he was on loan with Mersin and Mega Vizura.

On August 2, 2012, Cantekin signed with Banvit.

On September 17, 2014, he signed with his former team Mega Vizura. On January 20, 2015, he left Mega and returned to Turkey where he signed with İstanbul BB.

On October 6, 2015, he signed with Galatasaray for the 2015–16 season.

On August 15, 2016, he signed with Trabzonspor for the 2016–17 season.

On August 7, 2017, he signed with Yeşilgiresun Belediye for the 2017–18 season.

On September 5, 2018, he signed with Beşiktaş for the 2018–19 season. 

On December 19, 2019, he has signed with Frutti Extra Bursaspor of the Turkish Super League (BSL). 

On July 1, 2021, he has signed with  Gaziantep Basketbol of the Basketbol Süper Ligi (BSL).

On August 7, 2022, he has signed with Pınar Karşıyaka of the Basketbol Süper Ligi (BSL).

Turkish national team
He was also a regular Turkey youth national team player.

References

External links
 Adriatic League profile
 Eurobasket.com profile
 FIBA.com profile
 TBLStat.net profile

1990 births
Living people
ABA League players
Anadolu Efes S.K. players
Bandırma B.İ.K. players
Basketball League of Serbia players
Beşiktaş men's basketball players
Bursaspor Basketbol players
Centers (basketball)
Galatasaray S.K. (men's basketball) players
Gaziantep Basketbol players
İstanbul Büyükşehir Belediyespor basketball players
KK Mega Basket players
Mersin Büyükşehir Belediyesi S.K. players
Naturalized citizens of Turkey
Pertevniyal S.K. players
Serbian emigrants to Turkey
Serbian expatriate basketball people in Turkey
Serbian men's basketball players
Sportspeople from Kragujevac
Trabzonspor B.K. players
Turkish expatriate basketball people in Serbia
Turkish men's basketball players
Turkish people of Serbian descent
Yeşilgiresun Belediye players